KBPL (107.9 FM, "107.9 KBPI") is a radio station licensed to Pueblo, Colorado, and serving the Colorado Springs/Pueblo radio market. Owned by iHeartMedia, it broadcasts an Active rock format. The transmitter is located on Cheyenne Mountain amid other TV and FM towers for stations in the Colorado Springs-Pueblo market.

History
The station first signed on as KRYT on March 3, 1987.  It was the FM counterpart to AM 1350 KGHF (now KUBE). The call sign reflected the station nickname "K-Right," as 107.9 is at the far right end of the FM dial. On December 1, 1988, the station changed its call sign to KRYT-FM.

On January 1, 1993, the station was bought by the McCoy Broadcasting Company.  It became KDZA-FM. The KDZA call letters had previously been on AM 1230 which had been sold to Pueblo Community College. KDZA-FM had an oldies format. On June 24, 2008, it switched to classic hits, calling itself Jet 107.9.

In 2000, it was sold to Clear Channel Communications, the forerunner of today's iHeartMedia. On July 13, 2009, Clear Channel flipped KDZA-FM to Album Rock and moved the studios and offices to Colorado Springs. KDZA-FM switched to classic rock as Z107.9 on November 30, 2011. A few years later, KDZA-FM got a boost in its coverage area when it was allowed to relocate its tower to Cheyenne Mountain.

On December 11, 2017, KDZA-FM flipped to active rock as a repeater of KBPI in Fort Collins, and joined as part of a trimulcast with KPAW in Fort Collins and K300CP in Denver. KDZA-FM changed its call sign to KBPL on January 23, 2018.

On January 28, 2019, KBPL split from its simulcast with KBPI and launched an active rock format, branded on its webstream as "KBPI South", with a different playlist and a slightly different airstaff.

References

External links

BPL
Radio stations established in 1986
1986 establishments in Colorado
IHeartMedia radio stations
Active rock radio stations in the United States